Stirling James Hinchliffe (born 23 November 1970), is an Australian politician. Born in Dalby, Queensland, he was educated at state schools and received a Bachelor of Arts from the University of Queensland. He was a property industry analyst, policy manager, policy advisor and executive officer before his entry into politics. He had a long involvement with the Australian Labor Party, which included a position as National Secretary of Young Labor in 1995. In the 2006 Queensland state election, he was elected to the safe Labor seat of Stafford, which he represented until being defeated in the 2012 Queensland state election. Hinchliffe previously served as a cabinet minister in the Bligh Ministry

Hinchliffe returned to parliament in 2015 as the member for Sandgate. He was sworn in as Assistant Minister of State Assisting the Premier in the Palaszczuk Ministry on 16 February 2015. He was also nominated as Leader of the House, an appointment confirmed when the Legislative Assembly of Queensland met for the first time following the election.

In December 2015, he was elevated to Minister for Transport and the Commonwealth Games. In February 2017, he resigned as the Minister for Transport and the Commonwealth Games following an ongoing series of railway passenger services being cancelled due to there being an insufficient number of train drivers, a situation exacerbated by the opening in 2016 of the Redcliffe Peninsula railway line. Hinchliffe's resignation came despite a commission of inquiry not attributing any blame to him, finding that the difficulties were a result of structural and cultural problems within Queensland Rail.

Following the 2017 State Election, Hinchliffe re-entered Cabinet as the Minister for Local Government, Minister for Racing and Minister for Multicultural Affairs. He was charged with responding to a number of integrity issues with the local government sector in Queensland, culminating in him dismissing the entire Ipswich and Logan City Councils. He also oversaw the return of racing to the Eagle Farm Racecourse after extensive track remediation, and has increased funding to multicultural community groups across Queensland.

Following the re-election of the Palaszczuk Government in 2020, Hinchliffe was appointed as the Minister for Tourism Industry Development, Innovation and Minister for Sport. On October 7, following Brisbane's successful bid for the 2032 Olympic Games, Premier Annastacia Palaszczuk made a minor reshuffle to her Cabinet. This resulted in Stirling's portfolio being tweaked to become the Minister for Tourism, Innovation and Sport and Minister Assisting the Premier on Olympics and Paralympics Sport and Engagement.

References

External links
 Strachan Commission of Inquiry Report on Queensland Rail train crewing practices

1970 births
Living people
Members of the Queensland Legislative Assembly
Australian Labor Party members of the Parliament of Queensland
Labor Right politicians
University of Queensland alumni
21st-century Australian politicians